Subah-O-Sham is a 1972 Indo-Iranian film directed by Tapi Chanakya.The film was shot simultaneously in Hindi and Persian. The Iranian version was released as Homaye Saadet in 1971.

Plot
The film is based in Tehran, Iran. Aarun falls in love with a beautiful dancer Shirin. Due to her dubious profession, Aarun and his brother Naseer decide to lie about her origins to their mother. Unfortunately, she finds out the truth and forbids Shirin from marrying her son. Aarun, believing Shirin has changed her mind and refused to marry him, is angered and marries another woman, Nazneen. Only Naseer knows the truth of why Shirin refused to marry Aarun. Years later, Aarun and Nazneen's son, Romil, becomes best friends with a fatherless boy, Razzaq, who invites Aarun to his home. When Aarun goes to his house, he finds out that Razzaq is his and Shirin's own son. Following the death of Nazneen, Aarun finally manages to convince his mother to accept Razzaq as her grandson, and Shirin as his wife.

Cast
Mohammad Ali Fardin as Aarun
Sanjeev Kumar as Naseer
Waheeda Rehman as Shirin

Soundtrack

The soundtrack was composed by Laxmikant–Pyarelal.

Iranian version 
All lyrics are written by Shahyar Ghanbari

 Mast Masti Kon - Googoosh
 Toor Sepi Rakht Dar - Googoosh
 Shapoor Koochooloo - Googoosh

References

External links
 

1972 films
1970s Hindi-language films
1972 drama films
1972 multilingual films
Films shot in Iran
Films scored by Laxmikant–Pyarelal
Films directed by Tapi Chanakya
Iranian romantic drama films
Indian romantic drama films
Indian multilingual films
Iranian multilingual films
1970s Persian-language films
Films set in Tehran
Films shot in Tehran
Films set in Iran